King George High School is a high school in King George County, Virginia, United States. It has been the only high school in the county since 1968, when the county's schools were integrated and Ralph Bunche High School was closed.

It is the school district for areas adjacent to Naval Surface Warfare Center Dahlgren Division.

Athletics
The Men's Basketball team won the 1969-1970 state championship, the only team state championship for the school.

From the late 1990s until the early 2000s King George won 7 consecutive championships under the leadership of the legendary coach Jim Moyer.

King George High School has won six consecutive Men's district championships and 4 consecutive Women's district titles with the Men's team placing 3rd in the state of Virginia A/AA swimming and diving championships in 2005.  The Women's swim team won the district title in 1997, 1998, 2005 and 2008-2011 while the Men's team has won in 2005 and 2008-2011

Notable alumni
 Krystal Ball, Democratic Party Congressional candidate for Virginia.
 Jermon Bushrod, left tackle for the Miami Dolphins
 Collette Wolfe, actress

References

See also
Ralph Bunche High School

Public high schools in Virginia
High School
Educational institutions established in 1968
1968 establishments in Virginia